The Fred Meyer Challenge was a charity golf tournament played in the Portland metropolitan area in the U.S. state of Oregon. Held from 1986 to 2002, it was organized by Portland native and PGA Tour golfer Peter Jacobsen and sponsored by the then locally owned hypermarket chain Fred Meyer. The field included active and retired PGA Tour players. It was always played as a two-man team best ball event. In its inaugural year, it was played as in a match play format, with four teams competing. For the rest of its tenure, it was played in a stroke play format, with 8 to 12 teams competing.

History
From 1986 to 1997, the winning team split a $100,000 first prize. In 1998, this increased to $150,000 and in 2000 to $180,000. After Fred Meyer was acquired by Kroger, it discontinued sponsorship of the event and the tournament was also discontinued. Jacobson then brought The Tradition to Oregon starting in 2003, where it stayed through 2010.  In 2011, Jacobson's Peter Jacobsen Sports tried to revive the challenge tournament with the Umpqua Bank Challenge, which drew 15,000 to the Portland Golf Club for the 2011 tournament and 10,000 spectators to the 2012 edition at The Reserve. In October 2012, Jacobson announced there would not be a tournament in 2013, and that the 2012 tournament may have been the last one.

Tournament hosts

Winners

Multiple winners

As a team
3 wins
Brad Faxon and Greg Norman: 1995, 1996, 1997
2 wins
John Cook and Mark O'Meara: 1994, 2000
Billy Andrade and Brad Faxon: 1999, 2001

As an individual
5 wins
Brad Faxon: 1995, 1996, 1997, 1999, 2001
4 wins
Greg Norman: 1986, 1995, 1996, 1997
3 wins
Billy Andrade: 1992, 1999, 2001
2 wins
Paul Azinger: 1988, 1991
John Cook: 1994, 2000
Mark O'Meara: 1994, 2000

References

PGA Tour unofficial money events
Golf in Oregon
Sports in Portland, Oregon
Sports competitions in Oregon
Sports in Hillsboro, Oregon
Annual events in Oregon
Recurring sporting events established in 1986
Recurring sporting events disestablished in 2002
1986 establishments in Oregon
2002 disestablishments in Oregon